Ormetica temperata is a moth of the family Erebidae. It was described by William Schaus in 1921. It is found in Mexico.

References

Ormetica
Moths described in 1921
Arctiinae of South America